The Last Son of Krypton may refer to:

Superman, the last descendant of the Kryptonian race
The Eradicator, a Kryptonian artifact which briefly believed itself to be Superman
Superman: Last Son of Krypton, a 1978 origin story novel
Superman: The Last Son of Krypton, a 1996 television film that served as the series premiere of Superman: The Animated Series (split into a three-parter episode for reruns)